Cry of the Banshee is a 1970 British horror film directed by Gordon Hessler and starring Vincent Price as an evil witchhunter.  The film was released by American International Pictures. The film costars Elisabeth Bergner, Hilary Dwyer, and Hugh Griffith.

The title credit sequence was animated by Terry Gilliam.

Plot
The film is set in Elizabethan England.

Lord Edward Whitman, a wicked magistrate, presides over the trial of a young woman. Ruling that she is a witch, he has her branded, whipped through the streets, then placed in the village stocks. That night, Whitman hosts a feast at his home as his henchmen search the countryside for the killers of a sheep. Two poor teenagers are pulled into the hall. A burst of wolf-like howling from outside the walls warns that they may be "devil-marked". Both are killed in an ensuing struggle. Whitman's wife, Lady Patricia, calls Whitman a murderer for this. When Whitman's oldest son, Sean, rapes Lady Patricia, Whitman decides he wants to "clean up" the witches in the area.

Assisted by Sean, Whitman goes hunting in the hills for witches. His armed posse breaks up what is apparently meant to be a witches' Black Sabbath. He kills several of them and tells the rest to scatter to the hills and never return. This angers the leader of the coven, Oona. To get revenge on the Whitman family, Oona summons a demonic spirit to destroy the family. Unfortunately, the spirit takes possession of the loyal servant, Roderick, who Maureen Whitman has been in love with for years. Roderick begins to systematically kill off members of the Whitman family, including Sean and Lady Patricia.

Eventually, Harry, Whitman's son from Cambridge, and a priest named Father Tom, find Oona and her coven conjuring the death of Maureen. They kill Oona and her coven, and Roderick, who was attacking Maureen, breaks off and leaves her. However, he soon returns and attacks Whitman. Maureen shoots the demon in the head, apparently killing him.

Exhilarated that the curse is over, Whitman plans to leave the house by coach with his remaining children. On the way, he stops at the cemetery so he can reassure himself Roderick is dead. To his horror, he finds the coffin empty. Shocked, Whitman hurries back to the carriage. Once inside, he finds Maureen and Harry dead. It is revealed that his driver, Bully Boy, was killed by Roderick, who is now driving the coach. The film ends with Whitman screeching his driver's name in terror as the coach heads for parts unknown.

Cast 

Vincent Price as Lord Edward Whitman
 Hilary Dwyer as Maureen Whitman
Essy Persson as Lady Patricia Whitman
Hugh Griffith as Mickey
Patrick Mower as Roderick
 Elisabeth Bergner as Oona
 Carl Rigg as Harry Whitman 
Sally Geeson as Sarah
Stephan Chase as Sean Whitman
Marshall Jones as Father Tom
Andrew McCulloch as Bully Boy
Michael Elphick as Burke
Pamela Moiseiwitsch as Maid
 Richard Everrett as Timothy
Peter Benson as Brander
Robert Hutton as Party Guest
Pamela Farbrother as Margaret
Jan Rossini as Bess
Quinn O'Hara as Maggie
Guy Deghy as Party Guest
Joyce Mandre as Party Guest
Jane Deady as Naked Girl

Trivia 

 The titular "cry of the banshee" is a signal that someone will die.  This is a Celtic legend about a type of ghost and has nothing to do with Satanism. However, “the cry of the banshee” is repeatedly referenced in the banquet sequence of the film during which the two local juveniles are murdered.
 The film was played at the first Quentin Tarantino Film Festival in 1997 at the Dobie residence hall near the University of Texas.
 It is mentioned in the Rob Zombie song "Demonoid Phenomenon," from his 1998 album Hellbilly Deluxe.
 The opening credits were created by Terry Gilliam.
 The film was promoted with a poem, spuriously attributed to Edgar Allan Poe:

Who spurs the beast the corpse will ride?
Who cries the cry that kills?
When Satan questioned, who replied?
Whence blows this wind that chills?
Who walks amongst these empty graves
And seeks a place to lie?
'Tis something God ne'er had planned,
A thing that ne'er had learned to die.

 The title of the film inspired the name of the post-punk band Siouxsie and The Banshees.

Production

Script
Gordon Hessler did not like Tim Kelly's original script and hired Chris Wicking to rewrite it. Hessler says he would have got Wicking to change it further and improving the witch characters - but AIP would not let him.

Hessler said "The film was sold and we had to have it finished by a certain time." He and Wicking went to Scotland to make a different picture about witches. They talked to witches and researched their history and made the witches more sympathetic.

Hessler says "the whole of AIP got so alarmed because we were changing it so much. They came down on us and said that we could alter it 10 percent, but no more than that. So all of our work went down the drain on Cry of the Banshee Out of all the films I did for AIP, I think it's the least interesting."

Wicking says he saw the film as a Jacobean revenge tragedy "but I didn't want to tell anybody that because they'd hate that."

Casting
Elisabeth Bergner made her first appearance in an English film in 30 years. Hessler says AIP's head of British production "Deke" Hayward "would try to find some well known actor to dress up the picture--who at least Americans would be familiar with--which was a good idea." For this film Hayward suggested Hessler cast Elisabeth Bergner. "She was marvelous, out of her depths and aged at the time, and playing a very strange part. But she gave it her everything." Price says Bergner told him she took the part "because she wanted to be seen".

Hessler thought Hilary Dwyer was under contract to AIP. "I don't know what the situation was, but they liked her and they kept pushing you to use certain actors. I guess the management must have thought she was star material or something like that."

Shooting
Filming started November 1969. It took place at Grim's Dyke, the former home of the dramatist W. S. Gilbert in Harrow Weald, London.

"It's becoming harder and harder to scare people," said Price during filming. "We still rely on the basic elements of fear: snake, rats, claustrophobia, but we're adding all the time."

Hessler remembers when they did the film Price "was very upset with AIP" over contractual issues. "When we had the wrap party, he didn't want to come if Arkoff was there. I told him that I wouldn't dream of having the party without him. So he came, and of course he was quite drunk." Hessler says at the party everyone was in costume and a girl jumped out of a cake. "When we were looking for the knife to cut the cake, Vincent said, 'Take the knife that's in my back and use that!'" (However, following the making of the film, Price signed a four-picture contract with AIP over two years.)

Music
Hessler wanted Bernard Herrmann to do the score but AIP could not afford him. The original music score was composed by Wilfred Josephs but AIP decided not to use it, commissioning a score by Les Baxter instead. Josephs' score was restored in the later uncut DVD releases. Hessler later said "Wilfred Josephs' music held the picture up, it made it more mysterious."

AIP also removed Terry Gilliam's animation credits. Hessler said, "Deke was the one who put that animation in, always being way in advance of everyone else. About the music, I suspect that Les Baxter was a great friend of somebody high up at AIP... But to have Les Baxter do a kind of period picture where you have minuet dancing and that sort of thing, it's ludicrous. You really have to have somebody who has an idea of that time period."

Release
The US theatrical release featured the GP-rated print which replaced the opening animated credits with still ones, completely altered the music score, and was cut to remove all footage of topless nudity and to tone down assorted whippings and assault scenes. This print was also used for the original UK cinema release in 1970.
The film was a commercial success but Hessler was dissatisfied with it and called it the least interesting of the four movies he made for AIP.

Home video release

In April 1991, Cry of the Banshee was packaged as a Laserdisc double feature (Catalog Number ID7661HB), paired with the first of the Count Yorga movies, Count Yorga, Vampire. Both films were not letterboxed, but employed a full screen, pan-and-scan process.

The 1988 UK Guild video release featured the same heavily edited print as the US and UK cinema ones. All DVD releases, however, have featured the full uncut version, which also restores the original Wilfred Josephs music score.

References

External links 
 
 
 
 Cry of the Banshee trailer at MGM films

1970 films
1970 horror films
British horror films
1970s English-language films
Demons in film
Films about witchcraft
Folk horror films
Films directed by Gordon Hessler
Films scored by Les Baxter
American International Pictures films
Films set in the 16th century
Films set in Tudor England
1970s British films